The Mair are Rajput community traditionally found in northern India.

Caste identity

The Mair community was among those that challenged their official classification by the British Raj administration, which was based in large part upon the theories of Herbert Hope Risley. Under this system, the various communities of India were assigned a position on the social ladder in order to assist in categorisation for the 1901 census. In 1911, a caste association - the Hindu Mair and Tank Kshatriya Rajput Sabha of Lahore - petitioned the authorities in an attempt to overturn the classification that had been designated for both the Mair and the Tank communities, stating that

References

Further reading
 Chattopadhyaya, Brajadulal. The Making of Early Medieval India. Delhi: Oxford University Press, 1994.
 Jain, Kailash Chand. Ancient Cities and Towns of Rajasthan. Delhi: Motilal Banarsidass, 1972.
 Saggar, Balraj. Who's Who in the History of Punjab: 1800-1849. New Delhi: National Book Organisation, 1993.
 Singh, K.S. National Series Volume VIII: Communities, Segments, Synonyms, Surnames, & Titles. Delhi: Oxford University Press, 1996.
 Srivastava, Ashirbadi Lal. The History of India: 1000 A.D.-1707 A.D. Jaipur, Shiva Lal Agarwala & Co., 1964.
 Walker, Benjamin. The Hindu World: An Encyclopedic Survey of Hinduism. New York: Frederick Praeger, 1968.

Social groups of India
Punjabi tribes
Sunar